The 2016–17 Tour de Ski was the 11th edition of the Tour de Ski. The World Cup stage event began in Val Müstair, Switzerland on December 31, 2016, and ended in Val di Fiemme, Italy on January 8, 2017. The cups were being defended by Therese Johaug (Norway) and Martin Johnsrud Sundby (Norway).

Schedule

Overall leadership

Final standings

Overall standings

Sprint standings

Stages

Stage 1
31 December 2016, Val Müstair, Switzerland

Stage 2
1 January 2017, Val Müstair, Switzerland
 1 intermediate sprint, bonus seconds to the 10 first skiers (15–12–10–8–6–5–4–3–2–1) past the intermediate point.
 Bonus seconds in finish: 15-10-5 to the 3 first skiers crossing the finish line.

Stage 3
3 January 2017, Oberstdorf, Germany
 Men: 2 intermediate sprints, bonus seconds to the 10 first skiers (15–12–10–8–6–5–4–3–2–1) past the intermediate points.
 Women: 1 intermediate sprint, bonus seconds to the 10 first skiers (15–12–10–8–6–5–4–3–2–1) past the intermediate point.
 Bonus seconds in finish: 15-10-5 to the 3 first skiers crossing the finish line.

Stage 4
4 January 2017, Oberstdorf, Germany
 Bonus seconds in finish: 15-10-5 to the 3 first skiers crossing the finish line.

Stage 5
6 January 2016, Toblach, Italy
 Bonus seconds in finish: 15-10-5 to the 3 fastest skiers.

Stage 6
7 January 2017, Val di Fiemme, Italy
 Men: 2 intermediate sprints, bonus seconds to the 10 first skiers (15–12–10–8–6–5–4–3–2–1) past the intermediate points.
 Ladies: 1 intermediate sprint, bonus seconds to the 10 first skiers (15–12–10–8–6–5–4–3–2–1) past the intermediate point.
 Bonus seconds in finish: 15-10-5 to the 3 first skiers crossing the finish line.

Stage 7
8 January 2017, Val di Fiemme, Italy

The race for Fastest of the Day counts for 2016–17 FIS Cross-Country World Cup points. No bonus seconds were awarded on this stage.

References

Tour de Ski
2016-17
2016 in Swiss sport
2016 in cross-country skiing
2017 in German sport
2017 in Swiss sport
2017 in Italian sport
2017 in cross-country skiing
December 2016 sports events in Europe
January 2017 sports events in Europe